Sport West FC also known as Club Deportivo Vista Alegre is a Panamanian football team, for several seasons played at second tier championships and currently playing at amateur level after being disaffiliated in 2017.

They are based in Vista Alegre, Arraiján, but usually play their home games at the Estadio Agustín Sánchez in La Chorrera.

History

Deportivo El Tecal
The team was known as Deportivo El Tecal from Vacamonte and was promoted to the Liga Nacional de Ascenso (LNA) as part of the league's expansion for the 2009 season as runner-up of the 2009 season of the Copa Rommel Fernández (which they lost 5–4 to Millenium). They won their first match of the LNA 4–0 against Deportivo Génesis on 30 August 2009.

Deportivo Vista Alegre
For the 2013–14 season the team was renamed to Club Deportivo Vista Alegre. The club is a joint effort of the community and church to help the local youth and the chairman is former pastor Leovaldo Zurita.

Sport West FC 
For the 2016 season the team name was changed again to Sport West FC; besides finishing 9th on Ascenso LPF Apertura 2017, the team wasn't allowed to participate for the Ascenso LPF Clausura 2017 season, since they did not comply with the necessary documentation and regulations from FIFA, as well as by CONCACAF to compete as a professional football team, and was sent to local district amateur football league level. Also Panamá Viejo FC and New York FC teams were affected by the same resolution.

Year-by-year results

Liga Nacional de Ascenso

References

Football clubs in Panama
Association football clubs established in 2007